Gawalmandi is a town located in the central part of Lahore. It is regarded as the cultural centre of Lahore. The famous Food Street of Lahore is located here. Gawalmandi is a made of two words Gawala meaning Milkman and Mandi meaning Market. Formally Gawalmandi was one of the largest buffalo milk producing market in Punjab, until large number of Kashmiris started settling in after 1947. Gawalmandi is the hub of Butt family and many UK Butt nationals can derive their ancestry directly from these families. Formally known for wrestlers and thugs, culture in Gawalmandi shifted highly after Zia regime as more and more people started pursuing higher and even post graduate education. Gawalmandi has significantly high literacy rate.

Historical places
The area of Gawalmandi is surrounded by four road making a shape of  irregular trapezium. 3 out of four roads are named after Lords of British Empire:
 Lord Nisbet
 Lord Chamberlain
 Lord McLeod

At the end of Nisbet road and just at the junction of Qila Gujar Singh neighbourhood. The main square is called of the neighborhood is Maulana Zafar Ali Chowk.
Lahore's third largest flea market is located at Gawalmandi chowk.

King Edward Medical University, which is the second oldest medical college in the Indian subcontinent is also located here. Mayo Hospital, which is largest tertiary care hospital in region is located here as well, situated between Gawalmandi and the famous Anarkali bazaar.

The tomb of Shah Abdul-Maali is located within the vicinity of town as well as one of the oldest mosque called "Mai Laado" (Elder lady Laado) is located near Mayo Hospital.

References

Data Gunj Bakhsh Zone